Povilas Lukšys may refer to:

 , the first Lithuanian soldier to die in the Lithuanian Wars of Independence.
 Povilas Lukšys (footballer), a footballer born in 1979.